Orthohepadnavirus is a genus of viruses, in the family Hepadnaviridae. Humans and other mammals serve as natural hosts. There are 12 species in this genus. Diseases associated with this genus include: hepatitis, hepatocellular carcinoma (chronic infections), and cirrhosis.

Taxonomy
The genus contains the following species:
 Capuchin monkey hepatitis B virus
 Chinese shrew hepatitis B virus
 Domestic cat hepatitis B virus
 Ground squirrel hepatitis virus
 Hepatitis B virus
 Long-fingered bat hepatitis B virus
 Pomona bat hepatitis B virus
 Roundleaf bat hepatitis B virus
 Taï Forest hepadnavirus
 Tent-making bat hepatitis B virus
 Woodchuck hepatitis virus
 Woolly monkey hepatitis B virus

Structure
Viruses in the genus Orthohepadnavirus are enveloped, with spherical geometries, and T=4 symmetry. The diameter is around 42 nm. Genomes are circular, around 3.2kb in length. The genome codes for 7 proteins.

Life cycle
Viral replication is nucleo-cytoplasmic. Replication follows the dsDNA(RT) replication model. DNA-templated transcription, specifically dsDNA(RT) transcription, with some alternative splicing mechanism is the method of transcription. Translation takes place by leaky scanning. The virus exits the host cell by budding, and  nuclear pore export. Human and mammals serve as the natural host. Transmission routes are sexual, blood, and contact.

References

External links
 ICTV Report: Hepadnaviridae
 Viralzone: Orthohepadnavirus

Hepadnaviridae
Virus genera